Pincky Balhara is an Indian Kurash wrestler and Judoka.

Achievements 
From 24 September to 3 October 2016, India competed in the 2016 Asian Beach Games. The country's first medal was won by Balhara, a bronze medal in the 52kg wrestling (kurash) event.

At the 2018 Asian Games,in Jakarta, Balhara won a 52kg silver medal in Kurash.

References

Living people
Kurash practitioners at the 2018 Asian Games
Asian Games medalists in kurash
Asian Games silver medalists for India
Medalists at the 2018 Asian Games
21st-century Indian women
21st-century Indian people
1998 births